The Fall of Hyperion may refer to:
The Fall of Hyperion: A Dream, an unfinished epic poem by John Keats
The Fall of Hyperion (novel), a 1990 science fiction novel by Dan Simmons